The Escape of Debtors, etc. Act 1696 was an Act of the Parliament of England (statute number 8 & 9 W. III. c. 27), the long title of which is An Act For the more effectual relief of creditors in cases of escapes, and for preventing abuses in prisons and pretended privileged places.

Several locations in London, mainly liberties and extra-parochial areas,  had become notorious as hideaways for debtors escaping imprisonment. Those named in the act were Whitefriars, the Savoy, Salisbury Court, Ram Alley, Mitre Court, Fulwood’s Rents [or Fuller's Rents], Baldwins Gardens, "Mountague Close or the Minories",  the Mint, and "Clink or Deadmans Place". The privileges and immunities of these places were suspended so that the debtors could be pursued.

The Mint was a particularly well-known bolt hole and despite this act, remained so until the reign of George I, when a further act (9 Geo. 1 .c. 28) was passed. Two years later a similar act (11 Geo. 1. c. 22) applied to "the hamlet of Wapping-Stepney".

The Statute Law Revision Act 1867 repealed the later two acts in full and the 1696 act in part. A further partial repeal of the 1696 act came under the Statute Law Revision Act 1887.

References

 
 

1696 in law
1696 in England
Acts of the Parliament of England
1690s in London